Trentham may refer to:

Places
Australia
Trentham, Victoria

England
Trentham, Staffordshire, a suburb of Stoke-on-Trent, England
Trentham Estate, a visitor attraction 
Trentham Priory, now a ruin

New Zealand
Trentham, New Zealand, a suburb of Upper Hutt City
Trentham Military Camp, located in Upper Hutt

Surname
Elizabeth Trentham
Herbert Trentham
Richard Trentham, MP
Thomas Trentham
Thomas Trentham (died ?1519), MP